The ninth series of Dream Team was broadcast on Sky1 from October 2005 to May 2006. It followed the story of the fictional Harchester United in their first season back in the Premiership after winning promotion at the end of the previous season.

Series nine of Dream Team saw the programme undergo a major revamp in an attempt to stem the continuing decline of ratings in previous years. Various new characters were introduced, a new title sequence and remixed theme music were introduced, and more often dealt with storylines of a more grittier nature, that had first been explored towards the conclusion of the previous series. 31 episodes were produced in this series, one fewer than previous. This included a 90-minute feature-length special midway during the run as well as two episodes being shown back to back towards the conclusion of the series.

Cast
Only Danny Sullivan, Ryan Naysmith and Darren Tyson remained from the playing squad of series 8, the latter of three becoming a main cast member for the first time. New characters included enigmatic brothers Casper and Eugene Rose, Liam Mackay, physio Ashleigh King, secretary Amy Kerrigan and football agent Chloe Tyler. Lynda Block also returned to the series after a three-year absence, though had made guest appearances in series 6 and 7 beforehand.

Main cast
Jamie Lomas as Alex Dempsey
Lucinda Kennard as Amy Kerrigan
Naomi Ryan as Ashleigh King
Robert Kazinsky as Casper Rose
Julie Healy as Chloe Tyler
Danny Husbands as Danny Sullivan
Darren White as Darren Tyson
Junior Nunoo as Eugene Rose
Joachim Raaf as Felix Hahn
Jonathan Howard as Gavin Moody
Pedro Cunha as Hector Briganza
Duncan Pow as Liam Mackay
Alison King as Lynda Block
Ricky Whittle as Ryan Naysmith
Lauren Gold as Scarlett Rose

Supporting cast
Jessica Jane as Cindi Marshall
Natasha Symms as Kim Sullivan
 Stephen Haynes as Masked fan

In addition there were cameo appearances throughout the series by various Sky Sports News anchors as themselves. Kevin Keatings remained as match commentator for the fourth consecutive season.

Episodes

Dream Team (TV series)